Sobi's Mystic is a 2017 Nigerian romantic drama film, written, produced and directed by Biodun Stephen.

Sobi is a promiscuous man, who usually have his way with every woman he has encountered. Then he got attracted to a strange lady, simply known to him as Mystic at a night club. After series of sexual encounters with her, he developed feelings for her, which she doesn't reciprocate and eventually broke up with him. This got him more interested in knowing more about her. A twist to the plot is revealed, when Sobi discovered that Mystic has another life.

Cast 
 Bolaji Ogunmola as Aida/Mystic
 Kunle Remi as Sobi
 Mofe Duncan as Fowe

Reception 
It received a 4/5 rating from Nollywood Reinvented, who praised the originality, unpredictability of the plots and adherence to detail in the film. In its review, the film was praised for allowing the audience have various theories on how the story will play out, but eventually going in another direction. The film was also cited as an evidence then when the filmmaker (Biodun Stephen) functions in multiple role in the crew, it usually turn out  a properly done film. On True Nollywood Stories, it was praised for its originality, thoroughness, musical performances and good sound, while the reviewer noted that the film will keep audience speculating on its outcome, it reflected that the climax wasn't worth it. It praised Ogunmola's acting as Aida, but criticized the concurrent role as "Mystic", describing it as "too hard to be sexy, slurs her words, squints her eyes, moves slowly and portrays herself in a manner that seems forced". Sobi was also noted to have portrayed his "playboy" persona well, but his transition into being in love was tagged "unrealistic". It got a 55% rating with the reviewer concluding that "Sobi’s Mystic combines good music, fair acts, an imaginative story and a disappointing resolution, and winds up an average film". ·Daniel Okechukwu in its review praised the soundtrack and storyline.

References

External links
 

Nigerian romantic drama films
Films about bipolar disorder
2017 romantic drama films